Mărculești is a village in Florești District, in northern Moldova, with a population of 866 at the 2004 census.

References

Villages of Florești District